Davy Jones may refer to:

People 
David Jones (jazz musician) (1888–1956), American jazz musician often called Davey Jones
Davy Jones (baseball) (1880–1972), American baseball player
Davy Jones (footballer, born 1914) (1914-1998), English footballer for Bury
Davy Jones (musician) (1945–2012), English actor and singer of the band The Monkees
Davy Jones (racing driver) (born 1964), American winner of the 24 Hours of Le Mans in 1996
 Davey Jones (born 1968), English cartoonist with Viz (comics)
David Jones, the early stage name (and given name) of David Bowie

Fictional characters 
Davy Jones (character), captain of the Flying Dutchman from The Pirates of the Caribbean film series
Davy Jones, a figure of nautical folklore best known from the idiom "Davy Jones' Locker"
Davy Jones, a living wooden whale in John R. Neill's 1942 children's fantasy novel Lucky Bucky in Oz

Music 
Davy Jones (album), a 1971 album by Davy Jones
"Davy Jones", a song by French singer Nolwenn Leroy on her 2012 album Ô Filles de l'eau

Other 
Davy Jones, official dog of the Seattle Kraken ice hockey team

See also
David Jones (disambiguation)

Jones, Davy